Eduard Braesecke (born 30 November 1905, date of death unknown) was a German long-distance runner. He competed in the marathon at the 1936 Summer Olympics.

References

1905 births
Year of death missing
Athletes (track and field) at the 1936 Summer Olympics
German male long-distance runners
German male marathon runners
Olympic athletes of Germany
Athletes from Berlin
20th-century German people